Pelham is a rural locality in the local government areas (LGA) of Central Highlands and Southern Midlands in the Central LGA region of Tasmania. The 2016 census recorded a population of 33 for the state suburb of Pelham.

History 
Pelham was gazetted as a locality in 1970. The name was in use for a parish in the 1820s.

Geography
Most of the boundaries are survey lines.

Road infrastructure 
Route C182 (Pelham Road) passes through from west to east.

References

Towns in Tasmania
Localities of Central Highlands Council
Localities of Southern Midlands Council